Hamish Macdonald (born 18 May 1981) is an Australian broadcast journalist and news presenter.

From February 2020 until July 2021, Macdonald hosted the ABC's Q+A political panel discussion show. He has previously worked at networks including Channel 4, ITV and Al Jazeera English.

Career
Upon earning a journalism degree from Charles Sturt University in 2002, Macdonald began a short stint as a reporter covering politics in Canberra with regional broadcaster WIN Television. He moved to the United Kingdom, where he reported for Channel 4 and ITV.

In the UK's Channel 4 News, Macdonald built a career as a news producer and reporter. He covered major stories including the Asian tsunami and the London bombings. He reported live for Channel 4 and ITV news. He also reported as an eyewitness for Australian Networks Nine, Seven, and ABC.

Al Jazeera English
In early 2006, Hamish worked as a producer for Al Jazeera English's regional headquarters in Kuala Lumpur, Malaysia; Al Jazeera English is the English-language sister channel of the Arabic network Al Jazeera. In the summer of 2006, he was hired as a news presenter at the Kuala Lumpur bureau of Al Jazeera English.

Macdonald won the "Young Journalist of the Year" award at the Royal Television Society awards in London, on 20 February 2008.

Hamish later moved to Al Jazeera's London bureau, during which time he also acted as the UK correspondent for the Australian breakfast programme Sunrise. He left Al Jazeera English in June 2010.

Network 10
In November 2010, Australia's Network Ten announced that Macdonald would report for 6.30 with George Negus as a senior foreign correspondent and fill-in presenter.

Macdonald has been a fill-in presenter for Ten News and guest panelist and fill-in presenter on The Project. In June 2012, Macdonald was appointed host of a revived Ten Late News. In 2013, he hosted current affairs series The Truth Is.

Macdonald was widely criticized for posting a photo of himself, Magdalena Roze, Hermione Kitson, and Sandra Sully on Twitter holding champagne and celebrating at the GQ Man of the Year awards the same day 100 Ten employees had been axed. Chris Reason of the Seven Network, whose wife, Kathryn Robinson, was one of those axed, responded to the tweet "Congrats, but are these champagne days? 100 mates out of work."

Macdonald announced he would be leaving Network Ten in September 2013. Rumours surfaced the network was underwhelmed with MacDonald's The Truth Is series and MacDonald was upset Ten had not shown greater support for his work.

In 2017, Macdonald rejoined Network Ten, regularly hosting The Sunday Project and later being appointed the permanent host in January 2018. He remained in the position until December 2019 upon taking on his new role as host of Q&A on ABC. He will continue to appear on The Project as a guest.

In May 2019, Macdonald hosted the 2019 Australian Federal Election coverage on Network 10.

In July 2021, it was announced that Macdonald would return to Network 10 from 22 August to host The Project on Friday night and The Sunday Project replacing Peter van Onselen.

ABC Television Network (US)
On 6 January 2014, Macdonald joined the US television network ABC in a senior role as an international affairs correspondent. Despite being contracted to Network Ten in Australia until March 2014, MacDonald gained an early release from Ten which supported his new appointment. He was initially based in New York City but moved to London later in 2014. His ABC contract reportedly allowed him to accept limited outside work with other organisations in certain circumstances.

ABC TV
Macdonald hosted Q+A on Australia's ABC TV from February 2020, replacing Tony Jones as host of the panel program until his final appearance in June 2021. Macdonald was at the helm of the show as it moved from Monday night to Thursday. With Macdonald at the helm, viewership plummeted from 411,000 in early 2020 to 280,000 a year later.  By April 2021, the numbers had plunged even further, with just 224,000 metro viewers tuning in. Macdonald left the role after 18 months, stating that he was excited to be “moving into a new opportunity” and looked forward to working with the ABC in the future.

The abuse Macdonald received on Twitter while hosting Q+A, which prompted him to deactivate his account in January 2021, contributed to his decision to leave the program.  Similarly, another ABC presenter, Lisa Millar, also decided to quit the social media site in September 2021 due to the abuse she was also receiving while hosting News Breakfast.  Both Macdonald and Millar's experiences prompted a public discussion about the high level of personal abuse and bullying Australian journalists face on Twitter, and how the platform can better manage the issue.

Personal life
MacDonald attended the Sydney School, the Scots College.

Macdonald shares a media pedigree with his siblings. His older brother Rory is a producer and reporter with ABC Radio Sydney, while his older sister Kari Keenan is a producer for 2UE.

In 2019, Macdonald came out as gay and is in a relationship with partner Jacob Fitzroy.

References

External links
The Al Jazeera Aussies Sydney Morning Herald

Al Jazeera people
ABC News (Australia) presenters
Australian television journalists
Australian reporters and correspondents
Living people
Charles Sturt University alumni
1981 births
Australian LGBT journalists
Australian LGBT broadcasters
Australian gay men
Gay journalists